John Grainger (17 July 1912 – 18 January 1976) was an English professional footballer who played as a full back.

Career
Born in Royston, Grainger played for Frickley Colliery, Royston Athletic, Barnsley, Southport, Prescot Cables, Hyde United, Clitheroe and Bangor City, as well as playing as a wartime guest for Liverpool.

Personal life
His brother Dennis Grainger and cousins Jack and Colin were also professional footballers.

References

1912 births
1976 deaths
English footballers
Frickley Athletic F.C. players
Barnsley F.C. players
Southport F.C. players
Liverpool F.C. wartime guest players
Prescot Cables F.C. players
Hyde United F.C. players
Clitheroe F.C. players
Bangor City F.C. players
English Football League players
Association football fullbacks